Auburn–Washburn USD 437 is a public unified school district headquartered in Topeka, Kansas, United States.  It serves Southern and Southwestern Shawnee County, as well as a small portion of extreme northern Osage County.  It serves Southwestern and Western portions of the city of Topeka, as well as the communities of Pauline, Montara, Auburn, and Wakarusa.  It has one primary school, one intermediate school, seven elementary schools, one middle school, and one high school.

History
The district was established in 1966 as "Unified School District 437". , Auburn–Washburn School District is under the administration of Superintendent Scott McWilliams.

Schools 
The school district operates the following schools:

High school
 Washburn Rural High School

Middle school
 Washburn Rural Middle School

Elementary schools
 Auburn Elementary
 Farley Elementary
 Indian Hills Elementary
 Jay Shideler Elementary
 Pauline Central Primary
 Pauline South Intermediate
 Wanamaker Elementary

See also
 Kansas State Department of Education
 Kansas State High School Activities Association
 List of high schools in Kansas
 List of unified school districts in Kansas

Topeka is served by four public school districts, including:
 Seaman USD 345 (serving North Topeka)
 Auburn–Washburn USD 437 (serving west and southwest Topeka)
 Shawnee Heights USD 450  (serving extreme east and southeast Topeka)
 Topeka USD 501 (serving inner-city Topeka)

References

External links 
 

School districts in Kansas
Education in Shawnee County, Kansas
Education in Topeka, Kansas
1918 establishments in Kansas
School districts established in 1918